The Slackers are an American ska band, formed in Manhattan, New York in 1991. The band's sound is a mix of ska, rocksteady, reggae, dub, soul, garage rock, and jazz. The Slackers' notability is credited to their prolific career, tours of North America, Europe, and elsewhere, and signing to notable punk label Hellcat Records.

The members of the Slackers have also been known to perform in other bands and musical projects, including Reggae Workers of the World, David Hillyard & The Rocksteady Seven, Crazy Baldhead Sound System, Da Whole Thing, The Hall Trees, Stubborn All-Stars, and the SKAndalous All Stars. Vic Ruggiero performs as a solo act performing both original compositions as well as reworked Slackers songs, and has also played keyboards and piano on several Rancid albums.

Career 

The band's second album, Redlight, released on September 23, 1997, was ranked number seven in Billboard editor Carrie Bell's "The Year in Music (1997)" list. The album's track with the same name charted at number 116 on the week of November 10, 1997—the song's third week—in CMJ Radio Top 200.

Current lineup
Vic Ruggiero – keyboards, vocals
Jay "Agent Jay" Nugent – guitar
Dave Hillyard – saxophone
Glen Pine – trombone, vocals
Marcus Geard – bass
Ara Babajian – drums

Former members and contributors
Marc "Q-Maxx 4:20" Lyn – vocals
TJ Scanlon – guitar
Luis "Zulu" Zuluaga – drums
Jeremy "Mush One" Mushlin – trumpet, vocals
Allen Teboul – drums
Dunia Best- vocals, flute
Jeff "King Django" Baker – trombone
Tobias Fields – congas
Eric "Erok" Singer – alto saxophone, baritone saxophone
Dave Hahn – lead guitar
Ben Lewis – trumpet
Justin Redekop – trumpet

Former producers and collaborators
Victor Rice – producer and bass
Zack Levine – producer
Eric Sierra – songwriter
David Lindome – producer

Discography

Studio albums
Better Late Than Never (1996)
Redlight (1997)
The Question (1998)
Wasted Days (2001)
The Slackers and Friends (2002)
Close My Eyes (2003)
An Afternoon in Dub (2005)
Slackness (with Chris Murray) (2005)
Peculiar (2006)
The Boss Harmony Sessions (2007)
Self Medication (2008)
The Great Rocksteady Swindle (2010)
The Radio (2011)
The Slackers (2016)
Don’t Let The Sunlight Fool Ya (2022)

EPs
International War Criminal (2004)
The Slackers/Pulley Split (2004)
My Bed Is A Boat (2013)

Singles
"2-Face"  (1996)
"Minha Menina" (2007)
"Dreidel" (2009)
"New Years Day" (Urban Pirate Records, 2010)

Demo cassettes
Do the Ska with The Slackers (1992)
The Slackers (1993)

Live albums
Live at Ernesto's (2000)
Upsettin' Ernesto's (2004)
Slack in Japan (2005)
NYC Boat Cruise 2009 (digital only, 2009)
Slackfest NYC 2009 (digital only, 2009)
Holiday Party With... (digital only, 2009)
Live On the West Side 4/6/10 (digital only, 2010)
Live In San Francisco 12/31/10 (digital only, 2011)

Collections
Before There Were Slackers There Were... (1999)
Big Tunes! Hits & Misses from 1996 to 2006 (2007)
Lost and Found (2009)
Stash Box (2011)
Before Hellcat (2011) (USB flash drive release)
Ganbare! (2011) (Japan only release)

Compilations
Give 'Em the Boot
Give 'Em the Boot II
Give 'Em the Boot III
Give 'Em the Boot IV
Give 'Em the Boot V
Give 'Em the Boot VI
This Is Special Potatoe Vol. 1
From New York to Luxembourg (Live @ the Kufa) (with P.O. Box, Kunn & the Magic Muffins and Toxkäpp)
 New York Beat: Breaking and Entering Volume 2

DVDs
Give 'Em the Boot (2005): "And I Wonder"
The Slackers: A Documentary (2007)
The Flamingo Cantina Series with The Slackers (2009)

References

External links
The Slackers official homepage
Interview with The Slackers on www.grundfunk.net
Interview with the Slackers' singer Vic Ruggiero about the album Self Medication (2008)
Interview and studio session with The Slackers on National Public Radio (2001)
[ AMG entry]
The Slackers collection at the Internet Archive's live music archive
The Slackers' Chords, a website dedicated to The Slackers' music
Management (Europe)  Tourbooking (GER, AUT, CZ, DK, CH)

1991 establishments in New York City
American ska musical groups
Hellcat Records artists
Musical groups established in 1991
Musical groups from New York City
Third-wave ska groups